Fine metal chains are used in jewellery to encircle parts of the body, namely the neck, wrists and ankles, and they also serve as points to hang decorative charms and pendants. Unlike industrial or chains for other purposes, jewellery chains or body chains are designed for aesthetic purposes.

Material 
Jewellery chains are typically made from precious metals, mainly gold and silver. Platinum, palladium and steel may also be used. These metals are used because they are not very reactive, keep both their intricate shape and their strength, and require only minimal maintenance to keep their shine. Small lever mechanisms called findings serve as fastenings to enable the chain to be undone and redone.

Styles 

 Belcher: This is similar to the trace, a belcher chain link is wider than its thickness. Generally the links are round, but the shape of the link can vary.
 Prince Of Wales: This chain consists of a twisting chain made of small circular links, where each single link has no less than four others joining into it.
 Spiga: Spiga is formed of small figure-eight links which form a 3D chain that feels almost square, and looks as though the wire has been plaited.
 Anchor: The anchor chain copies the style of the chain that holds large anchors on ships, an oval link with a dividing bar through the middle. The interlinking sections may be of a curb or trace style. Also a version called Maritime where only every other link is an anchor link.
 Snake: Snake chain is a very tight-linked chain that has a round or square cross-section and has links that create a slight zigzag look.
 Bead: Bead chain is formed of small balls of metal joined by small lengths of wire, not longer than each bead in between. Also has its own 'snap over the first link' fastening. Larger steel versions are more often used to hold ID cards than in jewellery, but finer ones may be found for the purpose.
 Fancy: A "fancy" chain can be anything; any form of fine metal that can be replicated and joined onto each other to make a chain. Many fancy chains are variations of the standard styles, for example a trace chain formed of heart-shaped links or a curb chain with every other link set with a gemstone.

See also
Manin gold chain

References

Jewellery components